Uptown School Dubai is a Pre-K to Grade 12 school in Dubai, United Arab Emirates. It is a private institution managed by Taaleem, a UAE-based company and one of the largest education providers in the Middle East.

Curriculum
The school is an International Baccalaureate (IB) World School, providing education from Pre-KG to Grade 12. The school is fully authorised International Baccalaureate (IB) World School offering Primary Years Programme (PYP), the Middle Years Programme (MYP) and the IB Diploma Programme (DP). The school language of Instruction is English. The Arabic languages studies being in the Early Years Programme and French is offered from Grade 1 onwards.

KHDA Inspection Reports
The Knowledge and Human Resources Authority (KHDA) is an educational quality assurance authority in Dubai, United Arab Emirates. They are responsible for the growth, direction and quality of private education and learning in Dubai. They have consistently rated the school as "Very Good" on a 6 point scale, "Very weak, Weak, Acceptable, Good, Very good, Outstanding."

References 

International schools in Dubai
Buildings and structures in Dubai
International schools in the United Arab Emirates
International Baccalaureate schools in the United Arab Emirates
Private schools in the United Arab Emirates